The Ben Bullen railway station is a heritage-listed railway station on the Wallerawang–Gwabegar railway line at Ben Bullen, City of Lithgow, New South Wales, Australia. It is also known as Ben Bullen Railway Station group. The property was added to the New South Wales State Heritage Register on 2 April 1999.

History

Description 
The complex comprises a type 4 standard roadside station building, brick (small), erected in 1882; and a brick platform face, also erected in the same year; and a signal frame - (SU+L).

Heritage listing 
Ben Bullen is an excellent example of the smallest standard roadside station building used. It is located away from settlement in an area of farming and mining and is now in isolation at a level crossing site that gives the site a prominence in the country side. The building is well detailed and retains its timber platform awning with brackets. The building is an important example of the small scale railway station and is a visually important element in the local landscape.

Ben Bullen railway station was listed on the New South Wales State Heritage Register on 2 April 1999 having satisfied the following criteria.

The place possesses uncommon, rare or endangered aspects of the cultural or natural history of New South Wales.

This item is assessed as historically rare. This item is assessed as arch. rare. This item is assessed as socially rare.

See also

References

Attribution

External links

New South Wales State Heritage Register
City of Lithgow
Ben Bullen
Articles incorporating text from the New South Wales State Heritage Register
1882 establishments in Australia
Buildings and structures completed in 1882